Arrah (also transliterated as Ara) is a city and a municipal corporation in Bhojpur district (formerly known as Shahabad district) in the Indian state of Bihar.

Typonym
According to a Jain inscription found at Masarh village near the town, Arrah is mentioned there as Aramnagar (transl. City of Aramas). That "Aramnagar" later become "Arrah".

According to mythologies, the word "Arrah" or "Ara" is derived from the Sanskrit word Aranya, which means forest. It suggests that the entire area around modern Ara was heavily forested in the old days. According to mythology, sage Vishwamitra, the Guru of Rama, had his 'Ashram' somewhere in this region. Rama killed the demon Taraka somewhere near Arrah.

Arrah has also historically been known as Shahabad, a name given to it by Babur in 1529, when he camped here after his victory against the Afghans of Bihar. The name "Shahabad" means "city of the king" and was used in the former Shahabad district.

In Mythologies

Arrah has a mention in Ramayana. According to mythology, sage Vishwamitra, the Guru of Rama, had his Ashram somewhere in this region. Rama killed the demon Taraka somewhere near Arrah.  In Mahabharata it was the home of the powerful demon called Bakra, whose daily food was human being supplied either by villages of Bakri or Chakrapur (or Ekchakra), as Arrah was then called. Pandava came to Ekchakra during their wandering and they were entertained by a Brahmin whose turn it was to supply a human for the demon. On hearing this, Bhima decided to go himself to the demon as he has eaten a Brahmin's salt, and killed the demon.

History

Ancient

This place is also described by Xuanzang as the place, where the Demons of the Desert abused their strength and power and feasted on blood and flesh of man.

In ancient India, it was the part of Magadha. In 684BC Arrah was the part of the region ruled by Haryanka dynasty. During Chandragupta Maurya Arrah was the part of the great Magadh empire. The Pillars of Ashoka are found at the Masarh village in Arrah town. During 200 CE it was part of Gupta dynasty. Bhojpuri Folktales of Vikramaditya like Singhashan Battishi, Baital pachisi are still famous in the town and other Bhojpuri speaking area. It was also the part of Pala Empire and Chero empire. Bihiya and Tirawan were the capitals of Chief Ghughulia and Raja Sitaram Rai respectively.

Medieval

In 14th century Chero lost Western Bihar along with Arrah to Ujjainiya Rajputs under the leadership of Hunkar Shahi. They named the territory "Bhojpur" on the name of their ancestor Raja Bhoja. In 1607, a number of Chero chiefs combined to launch a spirited attack against Ujjaniniyas. One of the descendants of Sitaram Rai, Kumkum Chand Jharap drove out Ujjainiyas from the Bhojpur region and captured major parts of the territory. In 1611, Ujjainiyas defeated Cheros and recaptured the lost region again. Sher Shah Suri also defeated Chero during the early 16 century and made Sasaram its capital after defeating the Mughals. In 1604 Chieftain Narayan Mal got a land grant from Jahangir. After that Raja Horil Singh shifted the capital to Dumrao and established Dumraon Raj. Babur pitches his camp in Arrah in 1529 A.D and took control over it.

Modern

After the Battle of Buxar the British took control over Arrah. Arrah was one of the centres of revolt in 1857.

During the Indian rebellion of 1857, a group of 18 British civilians and 50 Indian soldiers was besieged in the Little House at Arrah, by a band of 2500–3000 armed soldiers and around 8000 others under the command of 80-year-old Veer Kunwar Singh, the Zamindar of adjacent Jagdishpur. A British regiment, dispatched to their assistance from Danapur, was repulsed, but the group withstood the siege for eight days until they were relieved by other East India Company troops.

In 1911 the king of England George V visited Arrah and prayed at the Holy Saviour Church. Between 1901 and 1911 the town suffered severely due to Plague. As a result, the population in 1911 became 38,549 which was 46,170 in 1901.

Geography 
Arrah is located at the elevation of 192 m from the sea level at the bank of Son river, Ganga River and Gangi River. Arrah lies at the confluence of the Ganga and the Son River, other small rivers that flow in the town are Gangi River, Badki Nadi and Chhotki Nadi.

The Ganga river acts as northern boundary of the town and due alluvial deposit the area is very fertile and considered as best wheat growing area of Bihar.The eastern boundary of the town is the Son river which separates and Bhojpuri and Magahi speaking regions of Bihar.

During the British Raj Arrah was the part of Bengal presidency. The land of the city is fertile and most used for cultivation with very low forest cover. The main crops that are grown here are rice, mango and mahuaa.

Climate
The climate is characterised by relatively high temperatures and evenly distributed precipitation throughout the year. The Köppen Climate Classification sub-type for this climate is "Cwa" (Humid Subtropical Climate).

Demographics

As per the 2011 census, Arrah Municipal Corporation had a total population of 261,099, out of which 139,319 were males and 121,780 were females. It had a sex ratio of 874. The population below 5 years was 34,419. The effective literacy rate of the 7+ population was 83.41 per cent.

Languages

Hindi is the official language with Urdu being the additional official. Bhojpuri is the most commonly spoken language, followed by Hindi and Urdu.

Administration
The Arrah sub-division (Tehsil) is headed by an IAS or state Civil service officer of the rank of Sub Divisional Magistrate (SDM).

Blocks
The Arrah Tehsil is divided into 8 Blocks, each headed by a Block Development Officer (BDO). List of Blocks is as follows:
 Arrah
 Agiaon
 Barhara
 Koilwar
 Udwant Nagar
 Sandesh
 Sahar
 Garhani

Civic administration
Arrah is the headquarters of the Bhojpur district. On 1 June 1865, the town constituted into a municipality which later became municipal corporation, which currently divides the city in 45 wards. Each ward elects its ward commissioner and, the Mayor is chosen through indirect election in which ward commissioners from respective wards cast their votes.

Police in Arrah is headed by a Superintendent of Police, who is an Indian Police Service (IPS) officer.

Culture

Arrah's native language is Bhojpuri, a language derived from Magadhi Prakrit. Bhojpuri festivals and cuisine is followed here. Food of Bhojpuri cuisine includes Litti-Chokha, Makuni (Paratha stuffed with roasted gram flour), Dal Pitthi, Pittha, Aaloo Dum, Jaaur (Kheer) and main snack and sweets are Khurma (sweets made of Chhena), Thekua, Pudukiya, Patal ke Mithai,  Anarsa, Gargatta and Laktho. Some of the drinks are Satuā, Amjhor, Taadi and Māthā. Khurma and Belgrami are the native sweets of this place.

The festivals celebrated here are Holi, Durgapuja, Chhath, Diwali, Teej, Jiutiya, Gai Dadh (Govardhan Puja), Jamdutiya, Eid, Christmas, etc.

Economy 
The city has industry area located near Koilwar. The mineral which is abundant here is sand of Son river. The alluvial deposits of Ganga river is considered suitable for brick making, the city mainly produces the revenue through building materials like sand and bricks. In last three year, 300 million tonnes of sand has been mined which has produced a royalty of ₹2800 crores.

Tourism

Arrah is a holy place for Jains and there are 44 Jain temples in the city. There is a centuries-old Jain temple of Parashanatha in the Masarh village. Some notable places of Arrah are:

Aranya Devi Temple
This is a temple of Aranya Devi (Forest Goddess). She is said to be the deity goddess of Ara town. Here one statue is of Adi Shakti and the second is established by the Pandavas. The temple is very old and draws many devotees every day. It is situated at the top of stone boulders.

Maulabagh Mosque
This Masjid was built in 18th century by John Deane, the collector of Shahabad. He had a Mohammedan wife with whom he lived 20 years with 6 children. After his death in 1817, he was buried in the outer garden of Maulabagh Mosque (called as Bibi Jaan ke Hata or Handa) where his tomb can still be seen. This mosques is also mentioned by British officers in their writings.

Koilwar Bridge
Koilwar Bridge connects Arrah and Patna, and is the oldest railway bridge of India. It was built in 1862 and is 157 years old.

Ramna Maidan
Ramna Maidan, located in Arrah, Bhojpur District, Bihar, the one of the largest urban parks in Arrah, It is spread across 60 acres of land.

Arrah–Chhapra Bridge

Arrah–Chhapra Bridge is also called Veer Kunwar singh Setu which connects Arrah and Chhapra is the world's longest multi span extradosed bridge in the world with a length of 1920m.

Maharaja College, Ara
The present Maharaja college premises is an important historical site.

Masarh
Masarh is a village 10 km from Arrah, the Lion capitals of Mauryan period have been found here. Masarh has been identified by Cunningham with Mo-ho-so-lo of the Chinese
pilgrim Huen Tsang,

Arrah House
Arrah House is a small British building in the premises of Maharaja College.

Holy Saviour Church
Holy Saviour Church is a church in Arrah, built by the British in 1911, when King of United Kingdom George V visited the city.

Education
Schools in Arrah are either government-run or private schools. Schools are affiliated by Central Board of Secondary Education and Bihar School Examination Board. Veer Kunwar Singh University is located here. Harprasad Das Jain College, Maharaja Collage, and Jagjiwan College are some of the premier institutions for higher education. Jain Siddhant Bhawan is a Jain Library in Arrah which is illustrious for collecting centuries older manuscripts in various languages.

In 2018, Bihar government has opened Government Engineering Colleges in each district of Bihar under the Department of Science and Technology. Government Engineering College, Bhojpur runs in the campus of Bakhtiyarpur College of Engineering and its own campus will be completed by 2020.

Sports
Cricket is the most popular sport, however other sports such as volleyball, basketball, and athletics are also played.

Veer Kunwar Singh Stadium is the stadium situated in the Ramna Maidan which hosts various cricket, football, and hockey tournaments. Other grounds in the town are Ramna Maidan, Maharaja college ground, Airport Ground, and Jain Collage Ground.

From 5–7 December 2019, East Zone Inter University Kabaddi championship took place in the premises of Maharaja College in which 47 universities of 12 different states participated.

Popular culture

In folk tradition 
 There is a very famous Bhojpuri saying about this place, Ara  jilā Ghar  Bata ' kawan bāt kē da'r bā" (trans. If you belong to Arrah, there is nothing to fear).
 Arrah also has mentions in many Bhojpuri Folk songs like Arrah Hile Chhapra Hile Baliya Hilela.

Films and songs
 Some shots of the feature film Gandhi were shot in Arrah near the Koilwar bridge.
 Shots of the first Bhojpuri film Ganga Maiyya Tohe Piyari Chadhaibo were shot at Arrah railway station.
 The story of the Bollywood film Anaarkali of Aarah was based on a dancer of Arrah and her confrontation with the Vice chancellor of Bir Kuber University (originally Veer Kunwar Singh University).

Books

 English book Two Months In Arrah, written in 1857, by a surgeon in British army named J.J. Halls, is an account of the Siege of Arrah.

Notable people

Villages 
Arrah block contains the following 115 villages:

 Village Durg Tola 50 hectares population 500

See also 
 Arrah House
 Masarh lion
 Arrah–Chhapra Bridge
 Koilwar Bridge

References

External links
 Official Website of Bihar State

 
Cities and towns in Bhojpur district, India